Manoranjan Grand is an Indian free to air entertainment channel that was owned by Manoranjan TV Group Limited. This Channel airs Animated Stories and Cartoon shows. Now It also telecast Pakistani Serials from Sab TV Pakistan on Prime Time.

Current Shows
Jai Hanuman
Pashuram
Hara Sindoor

Animated
 The Jungle Book Vir The Robot Boy Chacha BhatijaFormer showsWoh Rehne Waali Mehlon KiKahani Chandrakanta KiHaunted NightsKesariya Balam Aavo Hamare DesJhilmil Sitaaron Ka Aangan HogaRishton Ke Bhanwar Mein Uljhi NiyatiZaara Pyaar Ki SaugatDraupadi Crime SpecialVishnu PuranAap BeetiMata Ki ChowkiMalini IyerGanesh LeelaMaa ShaktiBhajan MalaOm Namo NarayanPyar Mein SavdhaanOm Namah ShivayBaaziAjnabi HumsafarJannat Chor Di Main NeMeri Dilli Wali Girlfriend''

References

Manoranjan Group
Hindi-language television channels in India
Television channels and stations established in 2019
Hindi-language television stations
Television channels based in Noida
2019 establishments in Delhi